Ethel Adjorlolo Marfo (also known as BoysDocta_Ethel) is a Ghanaian male rights advocate, educator and social entrepreneur. She is the founder and advocacy lead of Junior Shapers Africa (JSA), a non-profit organization for the development of males. She is Africa's first male child development activist.

Education 
Marfo graduated with a master's degree in Educational Leadership and Innovation at the University of Education, Winneba.

Career 
Marfo established the Junior Shapers Africa (JSA) on 21 September 2015 to help in the empowerment of young males in Ghana, Africa, the UK, the US and Thailand. She also founded Salon Cuties and Ghana Mompreneurs Club. She has also worked as Public Relations and Marketer for Guinness Ghana Breweries Ltd, Aviation Social Center Ltd and The Spelling Bee Ghana.

Awards and recognitions 
In September 2017, Marfo received an award from CIMG at the 28th edition of the Institute's National Performance Awards in Accra. She was honored because of her service to raising vulnerable young males in schools and communities.

She was also named among the Top 100 Most Inspirational Women of the Year by Glitz Magazine.

2021: Appointed As Faculty Member of The Prestigious EMY Africa Awards in Ghana (Exclusive Men of The Year)

2021: Recognised Celebrant of World Day of the Annual  World of The Boy Child Celebration originated in Trinidad & Tobago

2019: Listed in 100 Inspirational Women in Ghana by Glitz Africa

2018: Member of the Counselling and Guidance team for Mary Mother of Good Counsel School (Accra, Ghana)

2018: Marfo received the Value Added Education Award by Educom Awards, Ghana

2017: Listed in 10 inspiring mompreneurs in Africa by wetracker.com based in South Africa

2017: CIMG Special President's Award Recipient (Acca, Ghana)

2016: Listed in 100 Influential women in Ghana by Womanrising.com

Personal life 
Marfo is married with three daughters.

References 

Living people
Ghanaian human rights activists
Year of birth missing (living people)